Jules Kruger (1891–1959) was a French cinematographer. He is known particularly for films which he photographed in the 1920s and 1930s for Abel Gance, Marcel L'Herbier, Raymond Bernard, and Julien Duvivier. He also worked in Great Britain and in Spain.

Selected filmography

 Violettes impériales (Imperial Violets, 1924), dir. Henry Roussel
 Âme d'artiste (Heart of an Actress, 1924), dir. Germaine Dulac
 La Terre promise (The Promised Land, 1925), dir. Henry Roussel
 Napoléon (1927), dir. Abel Gance
 L'Argent (1928), dir. Marcel L'Herbier
 Cagliostro (1929), dir. Richard Oswald
 Tarakanova (1930), dir. Raymond Bernard
 La Fin du monde (End of the World, 1931), dir. Abel Gance
 Les Croix de bois (Wooden Crosses, 1932), dir Raymond Bernard
 Der träumende Mund (Dreaming Lips, 1932), dir. Paul Czinner
 L'Épervier (1933), dir. Marcel L'Herbier
 Lac aux dames (Lake of Ladies, 1934), dir. Marc Allégret
 Maria Chapdelaine (1934), dir. Julien Duvivier
 Les Misérables (1934), dir. Raymond Bernard
 Tartarin de Tarascon (1934), dir. Raymond Bernard
 La Bandera (1935), dir. Julien Duvivier
 Golgotha (1935), dir. Julien Duvivier
 Veille d'armes (1935), dir. Marcel L'Herbier
 La Belle Équipe (1936), dir. Julien Duvivier
 Anne-Marie (1936), dir. Raymond Bernard
 Club de femmes (1936), dir. Jacques Deval
 Le Roi (The King, 1936), dir. Pierre Colombier
 La Dame de Malacca (Woman of Malacca, 1937), dir. Marc Allégret
 Pépé le Moko (1937), dir. Julien Duvivier
 Les Perles de la couronne  (The Pearls of the Crown, 1937), dir. Sacha Guitry
 St Martin's Lane (1938), dir. Tim Whelan
 Vessel of Wrath (1938), dir. Erich Pommer
 La Charrette fantôme (The Phantom Carriage, 1939), dir. Julien Duvivier
 Le Récif de corail (1939), dir. Maurice Gleize
 Caprices (1942), dir. Léo Joannon
 Les Inconnus dans la maison (The Strangers in the House, 1942), dir. Henri Decoin
 Mam'zelle Bonaparte (1942), dir. Maurice Tourneur
 Untel père et fils (The Heart of a Nation, 1943), dir. Julien Duvivier
 Graine au vent (Sowing the Wind, 1944), dir. Maurice Gleize
 Au petit bonheur (Happy Go Lucky, 1946), dir. Marcel L'Herbier
 Siempre vuelven de madrugada (They Always Return at Dawn, 1949), dir. Jerónimo Mihura
 Mi adorado Juan (My Beloved Juan, 1950), dir. Jerónimo Mihura
 La canción de la Malibrán (Malibran's Song, 1951), dir. Luis Escobar Kirkpatrick

References

External links

1891 births
1959 deaths
French cinematographers
Mass media people from Strasbourg